Pinus cembroides, also known as pinyon pine, Mexican pinyon, Mexican nut pine, and Mexican stone pine, is a pine in the pinyon pine group, native to western North America. It grows in areas with low levels of rainfall and its range extends southwards from Arizona, Texas and New Mexico in the United States into Mexico. The seeds are large and form part of the diet of the Mexican jay and Abert's squirrel. They are also collected for human consumption, being the most widely used pine nut in Mexico. This is a common pine with a wide range and the International Union for Conservation of Nature has rated its conservation status as being of "least concern".

Distribution
The range extends from westernmost Texas, United States (where it is restricted to the Chisos and Davis Mountains), south through much of Mexico, occurring widely along the Sierra Madre Oriental and Sierra Madre Occidental ranges, and more rarely in the eastern Eje Volcánico Transversal range. There is also a disjunct population in the Sierra de la Laguna of southern Baja California Sur.

Description
The bark is dark brown, thick and deeply fissured at the base of the trunk.

The jay, which uses the seeds as a major food resource, stores many of the seeds for later use, and some of these stored seeds are not used and are able to grow into new trees. Abert's squirrel also feeds on the seeds in preference to those of the ponderosa pine.

History
Mexican pinyon was the first pinyon pine described, named by Zuccarini in 1832. Many of the other pinyon pines have been treated as varieties or subspecies of it at one time or another in the past, but research in the last 10–50 years has shown that most are distinct species. Some botanists still include Johann's pinyon and Orizaba pinyon in Mexican pinyon; the former accounts for records of "Mexican pinyon" in southern Arizona and New Mexico.

Mexican pinyon is a relatively non-variable species, with constant morphology over the entire range except for the disjunct population in the Sierra de la Laguna pine-oak forests of Baja California Sur; this is generally treated as a subspecies, Pinus cembroides subsp. lagunae, although some botanists treat it as a separate species, P. lagunae.

The seeds are widely collected in Mexico, being the main edible pine nut in the region. While palatable when raw, their flavor is considered to be improved when roasted.

References

External links

 Photos of Pinus cembroides tree and foliage
 Photo of cones (scroll half-way down)

Cembroides
Trees of Mexico
Trees of the Southwestern United States
Trees of the South-Central United States
Trees of Baja California Sur
Trees of temperate climates
North American desert flora
Drought-tolerant trees
Edible nuts and seeds
Plants used in Native American cuisine
Least concern flora of North America
Least concern biota of Mexico
Least concern flora of the United States
Flora of the Sierra Madre Occidental
Flora of the Sierra Madre Oriental